Elizabeth Frances Amherst may refer to:

 Elizabeth Amherst Hale (1774–1826), British-born Canadian watercolourist
 Elizabeth Frances Amherst (poet) (c. 1716–1779), British poet and amateur naturalist